Shahzadeh Ahmad (also Romanized as Shāhzādeh Aḩmad and Shahzādeh Ahmad; also known as Āstāneh-ye Shāhzādeh Aḩmad and Āstāneh-ye Shāhzādeh-ye Aḩmad) is a village in Mazu Rural District, Alvar-e Garmsiri District, Andimeshk County, Khuzestan Province, Iran. At the 2006 census, its population was 84, in 19 families.

References 

Populated places in Andimeshk County